SS Amsterdam was a ship built in 1879 at Dumbarton, Scotland, by A. McMillan & Son. It was originally named British Crown, but was renamed Amsterdam in 1887.

References

1879 ships
Ships built on the River Clyde
Steamships